Croatian Interdisciplinary Society (abbrev. HID) is a non-governmental organization operating in Croatia.  It acts to promote interdisciplinary education and research, primarily but not exclusively in the domain of complex systems. They are a member society of the International Federation for Systems Research.

Activities 
 INDECS, a peer-reviewed scientific journal
 DECOS, Describing Complex Systems, an academic conference
 AtoS, a seminar for students
 Sustavi, a popular science magazine

See also 
 znanost.org

External links 
 

Complex systems theory
Scientific societies based in Croatia
Systems science societies
2004 establishments in Croatia